Halowax is a New York-based company that was later owned by Union Carbide. It was subsequently taken over by Pittsburgh, Pennsylvania-based Koppers, which was later renamed Beazer East. It is the largest US producer of polychlorinated naphthalenes and polychlorinated biphenyls for floor finishing and similar applications.

References

Chemical companies of the United States